Humble Gods is the debut studio album of the punk rock band Humble Gods, released on October 17, 1995 on Futurist Records.

Track listing
 "Glad I'm Not You" - (words and music: Ricky Vodka) - 3:33
 "Concrete Jungle" - (words and music: Rod Byers) - 3:10 (The Specials cover)
 "Break It Up" - (words: Brad X / music: Doug Carrion) - 2:07
 "American Dream" - (words: Brad X, Spike X / music: Doug Carrion) - 2:11
 "Running Out Of Time" - (words: Brad X / music: Doug Carrion) - 3:05
 "Animal" - (words and music: Ricky Vodka) - 2:11
 "Fucked Up" - (words: Brad X / music: Doug Carrion) - 2:03
 "High Speed" - (words and music: Ricky Vodka) - 2:11
 "Lil' Red Book" - (words and music by Burt Bacharach and Hal David) - 2:10 (Love cover)
 "No Use" - (words: Brad X / music: Doug Carrion) - 3:11
 "Too Much" - (words: Spike X / music: Spike X, Jensen) - 3:32
 "Grandpa's On Speed" - (words:Spike X, Brad X / music:Spike X) - 1:59
 "Killer At Large" - (words: Ricky Vodka, Brad X / music: Ricky Vodka) - 3:18
 "Religion" - (words and music: Spike X) - 1:30

Personnel
 Brad X - vocals
 Ricky Vodka - guitars
 Doug Carrion - guitars
 Spike X - bass
 Blue Lou - drums

References

1995 debut albums
Humble Gods albums